Turbo magnificus, common name the magnificent turban, is a species of sea snail, a marine gastropod mollusk in the family Turbinidae, the turban snails.

Notes
Additional information regarding this species:
 Taxonomic status: Some authors place the name in the subgenus Turbo (Taeniaturbo)

Description
The length of the shell varies between 30 mm and 70 mm.

Distribution
This species occurs in the Pacific Ocean from Ecuador to Chile.

References

External links
 To Encyclopedia of Life
 To World Register of Marine Species

magnificus
Gastropods described in 1844